Juma Clarence (born 17 March 1989) is a Trinidadian international footballer who plays for Police FC, as a striker.

Career
Clarence has played club football for United Petrotrin, Hacettepe and  Caledonia AIA.

He made his international debut for Trinidad and Tobago in 2010, having previously appeared in the 2009 FIFA U-20 World Cup.

References

1989 births
Living people
Trinidad and Tobago footballers
Trinidad and Tobago international footballers
Association football forwards
2009 CONCACAF U-20 Championship players